Electoral district no. 1 is one of the 12 multi-member electoral districts of the Riigikogu, the national legislature of Estonia. The electoral district was established in 1995 following the re-organisation of the electoral districts in Tallinn. It is conterminous with the districts of Haabersti, Kristiine and Põhja-Tallinn in Tallinn. The district currently elects 10 of the 101 members of the Riigikogu using the open party-list proportional representation electoral system. At the 2019 parliamentary election it had 85,469 registered electors.

Electoral system
Electoral district no. 1 currently elects 10 of the 101 members of the Riigikogu using the open party-list proportional representation electoral system. The allocation of seats is carried out in three stages. In the first stage, any individual candidate, regardless of whether they are a party or independent candidate, who receives more votes than the district's simple quota (Hare quota: valid votes in district/number of seats allocated to district) is elected via a personal mandate. In the second stage, district mandates are allocated to parties by dividing their district votes by the district's simple quota. Only parties that reach the 5% national threshold compete for district mandates and any personal mandates won by the party are subtracted from the party's district mandates. Prior to 2003 if a party's surplus/remainder votes was equal to or greater than 75% of the district's simple quota it received one additional district mandate. Any unallocated district seats are added to a national pool of compensatory seats. In the final stage, compensatory mandates are calculated based on the national vote and using a modified D'Hondt method. Only parties that reach the 5% national threshold compete for compensatory seats and any personal and district mandates won by the party are subtracted from the party's compensatory mandates. Though calculated nationally, compensatory mandates are allocated at the district level.

Seats

Seats allocated to electoral district no. 1 by the National Electoral Committee of Estonia at each election was as follows:
 2023 - 10
 2019 - 10
 2015 - 9
 2011 - 9
 2007 - 8
 2003 - 8
 1999 - 8
 1995 - 8

Election results

Summary

(Excludes compensatory seats)

Detailed

2023
Results of the 2023 parliamentary election held on 5 March 2023:

The following candidates were elected:
 Personal mandates - Kristen Michal (REF), 9,214 votes.
 District mandates - Vadim Belobrovtsev (KESK), 3,231 votes; Raimond Kaljulaid (SDE), 1,819 votes; Anastassia Kovalenko-Kõlvart (KESK), 2,806 votes; Johanna-Maria Lehtme (EE200), 5,251 votes; Pärtel-Peeter Pere (REF), 1,474 votes; Signe Riisalo (REF), 4,523 votes and Varro Vooglaid (EKRE), 2,509 votes.
 Compensatory mandates - Andre Hänimagi (KESK), 466 votes; Tanel Kiik (KESK), 1,610 votes; Riina Solman (IE), 1,773 votes; Hendrik Johannes Terras (E200), 1,610 votes;   Kristo Enn Vaga (REF), 591 votes.

2019
Results of the 2019 parliamentary election held on 3 March 2019:

The following candidates were elected:
 Personal mandates - Raimond Kaljulaid (K), 7,303 votes; and Kristen Michal (RE), 6,347 votes.
 District mandates - Arto Aas (RE), 2,339 votes; Vadim Belobrovtsev (K), 1,969 votes; Marek Jürgenson (K), 1,813 votes; Tarmo Kruusimäe (I), 1,811 votes; Sven Mikser (SDE), 1,693 votes; Heidy Purga (RE), 4,763 votes; and Urmas Reitelmann (EKRE), 2,585 votes.
 Compensatory mandates - Kalev Kallo (K), 289 votes; and Riina Sikkut (SDE), 1,610 votes.

2015
Results of the 2015 parliamentary election held on 1 March 2015:

The following candidates were elected:
 Personal mandates - Mihhail Kõlvart (K), 10,996 votes.
 District mandates - Kristen Michal (RE), 4,766 votes; Eiki Nestor (SDE), 3,744 votes; Heidy Purga (RE), 3,283 votes; Märt Sults (K), 1,285 votes; Ken-Marti Vaher (IRL), 2,313 votes; and Viktor Vassiljev (K), 1,862 votes.
 Compensatory mandates - Kalev Kallo (K), 575 votes; Külliki Kübarsepp (EVA), 1,032 votes; and Lauri Laasi (K), 407 votes.

2011
Results of the 2011 parliamentary election held on 6 March 2011:

The following candidates were elected:
 Personal mandates - Deniss Boroditš (K), 5,896 votes; and Taavi Rõivas (RE), 6,710 votes.
 District mandates - Andres Herkel (IRL), 1,765 votes; Tarmo Leinatamm (RE), 1,562 votes; Eiki Nestor (SDE), 4,003 votes; Yana Toom (K), 4,510 votes; Ken-Marti Vaher (IRL), 5,412 votes; and Viktor Vassiljev (K), 1,914 votes.
 Compensatory mandates - Remo Holsmer (RE), 694 votes; and Kalev Kallo (K), 308 votes.

2007
Results of the 2007 parliamentary election held on 4 March 2007:

The following candidates were elected:
 Personal mandates - Rein Lang (RE), 7,025 votes; and Vilja Savisaar (K), 8,531 votes.
 District mandates - Jaak Aaviksoo (IRL), 4,241 votes; Eiki Nestor (SDE), 2,615 votes; Taavi Rõivas (RE), 1,701 votes; and Vladimir Velman (K), 3,342 votes.
 Compensatory mandates - Andres Herkel (IRL), 1,244 votes; Lauri Laasi (K), 705 votes; Maret Merisaar (EER), 443 votes; and Ken-Marti Vaher (IRL), 2,313 votes.

2003
Results of the 2003 parliamentary election held on 2 March 2003:

The following candidates were elected:
 Personal mandates - Juhan Parts (ÜVE-RP), 6,890 votes; and Vilja Savisaar (K), 5,919 votes.
 District mandates - Elle Kull (ÜVE-RP), 2,217 votes; Rein Lang (RE), 4,283 votes; and Vladimir Velman (K), 2,143 votes.
 Compensatory mandates - Andres Herkel (I), 1,238 votes; Eiki Nestor (RM), 1,233 votes; Evelyn Sepp (K), 292 votes; Avo Üprus (ÜVE-RP), 372 votes; and Ken-Marti Vaher (ÜVE-RP), 1,379 votes.

1999
Results of the 1999 parliamentary election held on 7 March 1999:

The following candidates were elected:
 Personal mandates - Jüri Mõis (I), 6,739 votes.
 District mandates - Arvo Haug (K), 2,234 votes; Valve Kirsipuu (RE), 3,556 votes; Eiki Nestor (M), 1,956 votes. 
 Compensatory mandates - Ivi Eenmaa (KE), 580 votes; Vootele Hansen (M), 1,209 votes; Andres Herkel (I), 737 votes; Kalev Kallo (K), 523 votes; Tiit Toomsalu (EÜRP), 134 votes; Rein Voog (RE), 527 votes; and Valentina Võssotskaja (EÜRP), 64 votes.

1995
Results of the 1995 parliamentary election held on 5 March 1995:

The following candidates were elected:
 Personal mandates - Siim Kallas (RE), 10,459 votes; and Andrus Öövel (KMÜ), 5,839 votes.
 District mandates - Arvo Haug (K), 2,561 votes.
 Compensatory mandates - Jüri Adams (I\ERSP), 1,626 votes; Karin Jaani (P), 670 votes; Krista Kilvet (K), 760 votes; Märt Kubo (KMÜ), 142 votes; Tõnu-Reid Kukk (KMÜ), 98 votes; Eiki Nestor (M), 1,250 votes; and Eino Tamm (KMÜ), 269 votes.

Notes

References

01
01
Riigikogu electoral district, 1